Antimachus of Colophon or Claros was an ancient Greek poet.

Antimachus may also refer to:
 Antimachus of Teos, ancient Greek epic poet
 Antimachus of Heliopolis, ancient Greek poet
 Antimachus (sculptor)
 Antimachus I, Graeco-Bactrian king
 Antimachus II, Graeco-Bactrian king

See also
 Antimachus in Greek mythology